Mount Sylvia is a rural locality in the Lockyer Valley Region, Queensland, Australia.

History 

Mount Sylvia Provisional School opened on 13 April 1885, becoming Mount Sylvia State School on 1 January 1909.

St Patrick's Catholic Church opened in 1897. It  has subsequently closed. It was at 1304 Mount Sylvia Road. 

Cross Lutheran Church opened on Sunday 26 March 1905.

Mount Sylvia Congregational Church opened in 1909. In 1977 when the Uniting Church in Australia was established through amalgamation of the Methodist, Presbyterian and Congregational Churches, it became Mount Sylvia Uniting Church. It was at 387 Back Mount Sylvia Road. It has closed and was sold on 17 February 2022 for $89,000. 

Heritage listings 
Mount Sylvia has a number of heritage-listed sites, including:

 Mount Sylvia State School, 6 Left Hand Branch Road

Education 

Mount Sylvia State School is a government primary (Prep-6) school for boys and girls at 6 Left Hand Branch Road. In 2016, the school had an enrolment of 46 students with 4 teachers (2 full-time equivalent) and 4 non-teaching staff (2 full-time equivalent). In 2018, the school had an enrolment of 26 students with 4 teachers (2 full-time equivalent) and 4 non-teaching staff (2 full-time equivalent).

There are no secondary schools in Mount Sylvia, The nearest government secondary school is Lockyer District State High School in Gatton to the north.

Amenities 

Cross Lutheran Church is at 143 Left Hand Branch Road.

References

Further reading

External links 

Lockyer Valley Region
Localities in Queensland